Wilfredo Gort de los Llanos (born November 9, 1940 in Havana, Cuba) is a Cuban-American politician. Gort was a former City of Miami Commissioner (1993–2001), and in 1996 was its acting mayor. In 2010, Gort returned to the City commission in the special election and was reelected in 2011 and 2015. Gort retired and opted to not run in the 2019 elections being succeeded by Alex Diaz de la Portilla.

Gort is the son of photographer, Alfredo “Willy” Gort (1909–2003) and Miami Cuban civic leader, Esther de los Llanos de Gort (1915–1984). He and his parents fled Cuba in 1952 after Fulgencio Batista overthrew the government and moved to Miami. In 1959, after Fidel Castro came to power, he returned to Cuba for 3 days and again went into exile.

In 1993, Gort ran against Joe Carollo, a former City of Miami commissioner and won the election. In 1996, Gort who was Vice-Mayor at the time became acting mayor at the death of Stephen P. Clark. In 2001, Gort resigned his commission seat to run for mayor of Miami, but did not make the runoff election that eventually elected Manny Diaz, mayor of Miami.

References
 The Miami Herald, Gort Sees His Role as Helping Foster Sense of Unity by Charles Rabin, October 26, 2001, Page 1B.
 The Miami Herald, High Profile by Ena Naunton, May 25, 1984, Page 2B.
 The Miami Herald, Esther de los Llanos Gort of Pioneer Cuban Family, Page 3B

1940 births
Living people
American politicians of Cuban descent
American people of Catalan descent
Hispanic and Latino American mayors in Florida
Mayors of Miami
Miami Dade College alumni
Florida International University alumni
Cuban emigrants to the United States
Latino conservatism in the United States